Vision for a Nation Foundation (VFAN) is an international non-governmental organisation that supports health ministries to provide local eye care services.

In its first nationwide initiative, it is providing everyone in Rwanda with local access to eye care and affordable glasses.

The Foundation was established in 2011 by James Chen, a Hong Kong-based venture philanthropist who is also the founder of international eye-care initiative Clearly. The foundation is based in the United Kingdom and operates in Rwanda.

Operations 

VFAN registered as a non-governmental organisation in Rwanda in 2011 and launched a national programme in partnership with Rwanda's Ministry of Health in 2012.

The programme aims to build locally accessible eye care services across Rwanda through the country's network of local health centres.

In 2015, VFAN launched an outreach campaign to bring eye care services to people across Rwanda. Teams of trained nurses will visit each of Rwanda’s 15,000 villages to provide eye treatment and affordable glasses.

It has been funded by UBS Optimus Foundation, the United States Agency for International Development, the United Kingdom’s Department for International Development (DFID) and the Chen Yet Sen Family Foundation.

Awards 

 2016 – Winner: “International Aid and Development”, Civil Society Charity Awards
 2016 – Winner: “Rising Chief Executive”, Third Sector Excellence Awards
 2016 – Finalist: “Big Impact”, Third Sector Excellence Awards
 2016 – Finalist: “Small Charity, Big Achiever”, Third Sector Excellence Awards

See also 
 World Sight Day

References

External links 
 "Vision for a Nation Foundation official website"

Health charities in the United Kingdom
Ophthalmology organizations
Foreign charities operating in Rwanda